Nizza di Sicilia is a comune (municipality) in the Metropolitan City of Messina in the Italian region Sicily, located about  east of Palermo and about  southwest of Messina.

Nizza di Sicilia borders the following municipalities: Alì Terme, Fiumedinisi, Mandanici, Roccalumera.

References

Cities and towns in Sicily